This article lists the prime ministers of São Tomé and Príncipe, an island country in the Gulf of Guinea off the western equatorial coast of Central Africa, since the establishment of the office of prime minister of Portuguese São Tomé and Príncipe in 1974. Leonel Mário d'Alva was the first person to hold the office, taking effect on 21 December 1974. The incumbent is Patrice Trovoada, having taken office on 11 November 2022.

List of officeholders
Political parties

Prime minister of Portuguese São Tomé and Príncipe (1974–1975)

Prime ministers of São Tomé and Príncipe (1975–present)

Timeline

See also

 Politics of São Tomé and Príncipe
 List of presidents of São Tomé and Príncipe
 List of presidents of the Regional Government of Príncipe
 Ministry of Foreign Affairs, Cooperation and Communities
 List of governors of Portuguese São Tomé and Príncipe

Notes

References

External links
 World Statesmen – São Tomé and Príncipe

Sao Tome and Principe
 
Prime Ministers
1975 establishments in São Tomé and Príncipe